Kontsevskaya is a rural locality (a village) in Moseyevskoye Rural Settlement, Totemsky  District, Vologda Oblast, Russia. The population was 3 as of 2002.

Geography 
Kontsevskaya is located 68 km northwest of Totma (the district's administrative centre) by road. Pelevikha is the nearest rural locality.

References 

Rural localities in Tarnogsky District